George Sperling House and Outbuildings is a historic home and farm located near Shelby, Cleveland County, North Carolina.  The house was built in 1927, and is a two-story, Classical Revival style yellow brick dwelling.  The contributing outbuildings were built between about 1909 and 1920 and include: a two-story, gambrel roof mule barn with German siding; corn crib; hog pen; wood house; two-story granary; smokehouse; generator house; and a tack house.  Also on the property is the barn, built in 1927.

This historic site was renovated and is currently the offices for the legal team of Teddy, Meekins, & Talbert.

It was listed on the National Register of Historic Places in 2001.

References

Houses on the National Register of Historic Places in North Carolina
Farms on the National Register of Historic Places in North Carolina
Neoclassical architecture in North Carolina
Houses completed in 1927
Houses in Cleveland County, North Carolina
National Register of Historic Places in Cleveland County, North Carolina